The Drepanidae are a family of moths with about 660 species described worldwide. They are generally divided in three subfamilies) which share the same type of hearing organ. Thyatirinae, previously often placed in their own family, bear a superficial resemblance to Noctuidae. Many species in the drepanid family have a distinctively hook-shaped apex to the fore wing, leading to their common name of hook-tips.

The larvae of many species are very distinctive, tapering to a point at the tail and usually resting with both head and tail raised. They usually feed on the leaves of trees and shrubs, pupating between leaves spun together with silk.

Taxonomy
Subfamily Drepaninae – hook-tips
Subfamily Thyatirinae – false owlets
Subfamily Cyclidiinae
Unassigned to subfamily
Hypsidia Rothschild, 1896
Yucilix Yang, 1978

See also
List of drepanid genera

References 
 Chinery, Michael (1986): Collins Guide to the Insects of Britain and Western Europe
 Minet, J. & Scoble, M.J. (1999): The Drepanoid/Geometroid Assemblage. In: Kristensen, N.P. (ed.): Lepidoptera, Moths and Butterflies Volume 1: Evolution, Systematics, and Biogeography, chapter 17. Handbuch der Zoologie. Eine Naturgeschichte der Stämme des Tierreiches / Handbook of Zoology. A Natural History of the phyla of the Animal Kingdom. vol. IV: Arthropoda: Insecta. Part 35. Walter de Gruyter, Berlin & New York.
 Skinner, Bernard (1984): Colour Identification Guide to Moths of the British Isles

External links

CSIRO Images

 
Taxa named by Edward Meyrick
Moth families